Beth Baker (born 1961) is an Associate Justice of the Montana Supreme Court. Elected on November 2, 2010 and sworn into office on January 3, 2011, she became the fourth woman to serve on Montana's highest bench. She took the seat of the retired Justice W. William Leaphart. Originally from Spokane, Washington, she graduated magna cum laude in 1982 from the University of Washington with a bachelor's degree in Speech Communication. Baker received her law degree, with high honors, from the University of Montana School of Law in 1985.

Baker clerked for Judge Charles C. Lovell of the United States District Court for the District of Montana, from 1985 to 1989. For 11 years, from 1989 to 2000, she was an Assistant Attorney General with the Montana Department of Justice. During this time she served four years as Assistant Chief Deputy Attorney General and four years as Chief Deputy Attorney General. She left state government to do private practice at the Helena, Montana law firm of Hughes, Kellner, Sullivan and Alke from 2000 to 2010.

Baker has served for ten years on the Montana Supreme Court's Access to Justice Commission, currently as its chair. She also serves as an ex officio director of the Montana Justice Foundation.  In 2006, she was awarded the State Bar of Montana's Professionalism Award.

References 

Justices of the Montana Supreme Court
Montana lawyers
Living people
University of Montana alumni
University of Washington College of Arts and Sciences alumni
21st-century American judges
1961 births
21st-century American women judges